True Detective is an American television crime drama that premiered on January 12, 2014 on the HBO network. It was created and written by Nic Pizzolatto. Conceived as an anthology, each season will be engineered as a disparate, self-contained narrative, employing new cast ensembles and following various sets of characters and settings.

True Detective was a candidate for television awards in a variety of categories recognizing its writing, acting, production, and direction. The show received eleven Primetime Emmy nominations heading into the 2014 Emmy season, scooping up five wins, among them being Outstanding Directing for a Drama Series for Cary Fukunaga. At the 72nd Golden Globe Awards, the show scored three Golden Globe nominations, including Best Actor in a Miniseries or Television Film for Matthew McConaughey and Woody Harrelson and Best Supporting Actress in a Miniseries or Television Film for Michelle Monaghan. Other substantial nominations include four TCA Awards (two wins), three Satellite Awards, and a BAFTA (one win).

McConaughey is the most decorated of the show's actors, with ten nominations. Pizzolatto earned two Writers Guild of America Awards (WGAs) for his work as a writer for the series. To date, True Detective has been nominated for 37 awards and has won 24.

British Academy Television Awards
The British Academy Television Awards, presented annually by the British Academy of Film and Television Arts (BAFTA), recognize distinguished artistic achievement in British television. True Detective has won one award.

Critics' Choice Television Awards
The Critics' Choice Television Award is an annual accolade bestowed by the Broadcast Television Journalists Association in recognition of outstanding achievements in television, since 2011. True Detective has received one award from four nominations.

Emmy Awards

The Primetime Emmy Awards are awarded annually by members of the Academy of Television Arts & Sciences for excellence and outstanding achievements in American primetime television. The branch of awards recognizing technical and production-based work (such as cinematography, editing, and music) are designated as Creative Arts Emmy Awards. True Detective has received five awards from thirteen nominations.

Primetime Emmy Awards

Primetime Creative Arts Emmy Awards

Golden Globe Awards

Awarded since 1944, the Golden Globe Award is an annual accolade bestowed by members of the Hollywood Foreign Press Association honoring outstanding achievements in television and film. True Detective received four nominations.

Producers Guild of America Awards
The Producers Guild of America Awards were created in 1990 by the Producers Guild of America to acknowledge the contributions of film and television producers in American entertainment. True Detective has been nominated once.

Satellite Awards

The Satellite Awards are the International Press Academy's annual entertainment awards, since 1997. True Detective has been nominated for three awards.

Screen Actors Guild Awards
Presented since 1995, the Screen Actors Guild Award is an annual accolade honoring excellence and outstanding achievement in television acting. Winners are chosen by members of the Screen Actors Guild. True Detective has been nominated three times.

Television Critics Association Awards
The TCA Awards are distributed by the Television Critics Association in recognition of distinguished artistic contribution in the television industry.  True Detective has won two awards from four nominations.

Writers Guild of America Awards
The Writers Guild of America Awards are presented annually to writers to acknowledge their artistic and technical achievements in American entertainment. Winners are chosen jointly by the Writers Guild of America, East and the Writers Guild of America, West. True Detective has won two awards.

References

External links
 List of awards and nominations received by True Detective at the Internet Movie Database

Awards
True Detective